is a Japanese rugby union player who plays as a Flanker or Number 8.

References

1995 births
Living people
Rugby union flankers
Rugby union number eights
Sunwolves players
Japanese rugby union players
Toyota Verblitz players